Eric Owen Simons (born 9 March 1962) is a South African cricket coach and former cricketer. He was an all-rounder who played 23 One Day Internationals for South Africa in the 1990s. He later became coach of the national side for two years but he was replaced in 2004 by Ray Jennings.

He was the Indian Cricket Team's Bowling Consultant from 10 January 2010 to 14 February 2012 after India's tour of Australia in 2011–2012.

He is the assistant coach of Chennai super kings from the past 7 years and also he was appointed as the assistant coach for the CSK owned Joburg super kings in the SA20 league recently.He was one of the guy who was trusted by the CSK owners for their successful journey in the IPL seasons.

References

1962 births
Living people
South African cricketers
South Africa One Day International cricketers
Northerns cricketers
Western Province cricketers
South African cricket coaches
Coaches of the South Africa national cricket team
Sportspeople from Cape Town
Indian Premier League coaches
Caribbean Premier League coaches